The Yakovlev Yak-14 (NATO reporting name: "Mare") was the largest assault glider ever to enter service with the Soviet Air Force. It was introduced in 1949, at a time when other air forces were abandoning the glider concept. In 1950 a Yak-14 became the first glider to fly over the North Pole.

Design and development
During World War II, the Soviet Union operated only light gliders like the Gribovsky G-11, Antonov A-7 and Kolesnikov-Tsybin KC-20 which were unable to transport vehicles, light tanks or artillery. Only after the war were Soviet designers ordered to develop medium gliders capable of carrying heavy or bulky loads. The Yakovlev design bureau was instructed to design an aircraft to meet this requirement, despite its relative inexperience in the design of such large aircraft.

Yakovlev's design, the Yak-14 was a high-wing monoplane. It had a rectangular section fuselage with a steel-tube and dural structure  with a fabric covering.  To aid loading and unloading of cargo, the aircraft's nose swung to the right with the tail section pivoting to the left. The two pilots sat side by side in an enclosed cockpit above the left side of the fuselage. They were provided with a display that used a transmitter in the towing aircraft to show the relative positions of the two aircraft when flying in cloud. The wings were made of dural and fabric and were braced to the fuselage by a single strut on each side. Large slotted trailing-edge flaps were fitted to the wings, while the aircraft was fitted with a fixed nosewheel undercarriage which could be made to "kneel" by releasing air from the pneumatic shock struts of the undercarriage, lowering the fuselage for ease of unloading or to make short landings on belly-mounted skids.

Testing
The first prototype made its maiden flight in June 1948 from Medvyezhe Ozero, near Omsk. Official testing resulted in a number of changes to the design, with a large dorsal fin being fitted, and spoilers being added to reduce landing runs, while the payload of the glider was increased to allow an ASU-57 assault gun to be carried. As such the Yak-14 passed its acceptance trials from August to September 1949, with the glider entering mass production later that year.

While some Yak-14s were constructed at Chkalovsk, the majority were produced at Rostov-on-Don. Total production was 413 series gliders.

Operational history
The Yak-14 filled an important role in Soviet service in the 1950s, being the only way of carrying large loads by air to remote parts of the Soviet Union without having to disassemble the loads. The usual tug was the Ilyushin Il-12.

One Yak-14 was flown to the North Pole in 1950, while another example of the glider's versatility took place in March 1954, when four Yak-14s made a long-distance flight to an ice station on an ice floe drifting on the Arctic Ocean, with the supplies delivered including a large bulldozer. The gliders flew from Tula on March 10, with several stops at Omsk, Krasnoyarsk and the Schmidt Cape, on Sakhalin island in the Far East, before reaching SP-4 in early April during a heavy freeze.

A few were delivered to Czechoslovakia in the early 1950s which used them under the designation NK-14.

Soviet Air Force transport gliders were gradually withdrawn from service with the arrival of turboprop transports like the Antonov An-24 and Antonov An-12, which entered service in the late 1950s.

Variants
Yak-14
Basic production variant.
Yak-14M
Increased payload version built from 1951.
NK-14 (Nakladni kluzak – cargo glider)
Yak-14s delivered to Czechoslovakia

Operators

Czechoslovakian Air Force

Soviet Air Force

Specifications (Yak-14)

See also

References

Notes

Bibliography

Yak-14 at Ugolok Neba 
 Gordon, Yefim, Dmitry Komissarov and Sergey Komissarov. OKB Yakovlev: A History of the Design Bureau and its Aircraft. Hinkley, UK: Midland Publishing, 2005. .
 Gunston, Bill.  The Osprey Encyclopedia of Russian Aircraft 1975–1995. London, UK: Osprey, 1995. .
 Gunston, Bill and Yefim Gordon. Yakovlev Aircraft since 1924. London, UK: Putnam Aeronautical Books, 1997. .

1940s military gliders
1940s Soviet military transport aircraft
Yak-014
Aircraft first flown in 1948